The 2005–06 Midland Football Alliance season was the 12th in the history of Midland Football Alliance, a football competition in England.

Clubs and league table
The league featured 19 clubs from the previous season, along with three new clubs:
Leamington, promoted from the Midland Football Combination
Rocester, relegated from the Northern Premier League
Tipton Town, promoted from the West Midlands (Regional) League

League table

References

External links
 Midland Football Alliance

2005–06
9